Child labour in Nigeria is the employment of children under the age of 18 in a manner that restricts or prevents them from basic education and development. Child labour is pervasive in every state of the country. In 2006, the number of child workers was estimated at about 15 million. Poverty is a major factor that drives  child labour in Nigeria. In poor families, child labour is a major source of income for the family.

Current status
UNICEF Nigeria is active for children's rights. Child workers include street vendors, shoe shiners, apprentice mechanics, carpenters, vulcanisers, tailors, barbers and domestic servants. Many working children are exposed to dangerous and unhealthy environments. In August, 2003, the Nigerian government formally adopted three International Labour Organization conventions setting a minimum age for the employment of children. The government also has implemented West African Cocoa Agriculture Project (WACAP). There is a similar incidence of child labour in rural and urban Nigeria.

The US Department of Labour in its 2010 report claims Nigeria is witnessing the worst forms of child labor, particularly in agriculture and domestic service. In rural areas, most children work in agriculture of products such as cassava, cocoa and tobacco. These children typically work long hours and for little pay, with their families. The report claims some children are exposed to pesticides and chemical fertilizers in cocoa and tobacco fields because of archaic farming practices or because they are deployed as forced labour without protective gear. Additionally, street children work as porters and scavengers, and a growing number of them engage in begging. The report claims commercial sexual exploitation of children, especially girls, is also occurring in some Nigerian cities, including Port Harcourt and Lagos.

Boys make up most of the children who work, but girls are less likely to go to school and tend to work for longer hours than boys.

Trafficking
There is trafficking of children in Nigeria. Child labour is more common among children of illiterates. On average, in the Southwestern zone of Nigeria, there is a higher work burden for working children. Boys tend to earn more. Girls' non-participation in schooling is more likely affected by parents' lack of interest than boys'. Non-participation in school is related to poverty. About one third of working children obtain no benefit from their employer. Child labour among pupils frequently impairs schooling.

See also
Child labour in Africa
Child sexual abuse in Nigeria
Slavery in modern Africa

References

External links
United Nations Africa Recovery paper
International Labour Organization paper on child labour in Africa

Nigeria
Economy of Nigeria
Human rights abuses in Nigeria
Children's rights in Nigeria